The National Wheelchair Basketball League (NWBL) is Australia's premier male wheelchair basketball league. It was established in 1988.

2019 teams 

Source: 2019 NWBL Ladder

Champions

References

External links
 Official website
 WBL Finals 2022

Wheelchair basketball leagues in Australia
Recurring sporting events established in 1988
1988 establishments in Australia
Sports leagues established in 1988